Mitterer is a German surname. Notable people with the surname include:

Erika Mitterer (1906–2001), Austrian writer
Holger Mitterer (born 1973), German cognitive scientist and linguist
Josef Mitterer (born 1948), Austrian philosopher
Peter Mitterer (1946–2013), Austrian politician
Peter Mitterer (archer) (born 1947), Austrian archer
Wolfgang Mitterer (born 1958), Austrian composer and musician

German-language surnames